Liechtenstein is a country in Europe. 

Lichtenstein or Liechtenstein may also refer to:
 House of Liechtenstein, the ruling family of Liechtenstein

Places
 Lichtenstein, Saxony, a town in Saxony, Germany.
 Lichtenstein, Baden-Württemberg, a municipality in Baden-Württemberg, Germany.
 Lichtenstein Castle (Greifenstein), castle in Hesse, Germany.
 Lichtenstein Castle (Lower Franconia), castle in Bavaria, Germany.
 Lichtenstein Castle (Württemberg), in Baden-Württemberg, Germany.
 Liechtenstein Castle, in Lower Austria (after which the family and the country are named).
 Lichtenstein (Osterode am Harz), a hill in Lower Saxony.

Other uses 
 Lichtenstein (novel), an 1826 novel by Wilhelm Hauff
 Lichtenstein (surname), shared by several notable people
 Liechtenstein Museum or Liechtenstein collection, of the princely family
 Lichtenstein radar, World War II German radar system